Lancaster Township may refer to:

Canada
 Lancaster Township, Ontario, now part of South Glengarry

United States
Arkansas
 Lancaster Township, Crawford County, Arkansas, in Crawford County, Arkansas

Illinois
 Lancaster Township, Stephenson County, Illinois

Indiana
 Lancaster Township, Huntington County, Indiana
 Lancaster Township, Jefferson County, Indiana
 Lancaster Township, Wells County, Indiana

Iowa
 East Lancaster Township, Keokuk County, Iowa
 West Lancaster Township, Keokuk County, Iowa

Kansas
 Lancaster Township, Atchison County, Kansas

Pennsylvania
 Lancaster Township, Butler County, Pennsylvania
 Lancaster Township, Lancaster County, Pennsylvania

Township name disambiguation pages